Redcliffe Airport is one of three local airports on the island of Ambae, part of Vanuatu. 

Redcliffe is secondary to Vanuatu's international airport, Bauerfield.

Its runway length is 2,230 ft. and its runway elevation is 36 ft.

References

Airports in Vanuatu
Penama Province